John Jarvis may refer to:
Jack Jarvis (1887–1968), British racehorse trainer
Jack Jarvis (Still Game character)
John Jarvis (set decorator), set decorator
Sir John Jarvis, 1st Baronet (1876–1950), British Conservative politician, MP for Guildford
John Arthur Jarvis (1872–1935), British swimmer
John Barlow Jarvis (born 1954), American songwriter and pianist
John Wesley Jarvis (1780–1839), American painter
John T. Jarvis (1847–1932), mayor of Riverside, California, United States

See also
John Jervis (disambiguation)